= The Strange Miss Sylvia =

1945 film by Paul Martin

The strange Miss Sylvia (German: Das seltsame Fräulein Sylvia) is a 1945 German romantic comedy film of mistaken identity. Paul Martin was the director. Shot under the Nazi Party regime, the film was not finished or premiered before the end of the Second World War.

== Plot ==
Excited at being offered a tour with the famous Frank Witte dance band, young pianist Hans Peters slips on the stairs and sprains his arm. His upcoming musical commitment, later that evening, is in jeopardy now as he is prescribed two weeks of rest. His sister convinces him to let her go on tour disguised as Hans. When she shows up in place of Hans, Frank is instantly annoyed with the limited musical talent of this "Hans". Sylvia decides to run away. Just as she has ditched her disguise, she runs into Frank, who instantly falls in love with his new musician's sister. Sylvia takes advantage of the opportunity and persuades Frank to give "Hans" another chance. Thus begins Sylvia's exhausting double life. In the day, she is the sister of the musician Hans, and in the evening she is the musician "himself". Sylvia explains to Frank she can't meet him after performances because she works as a telephone operator at the time. Frank finds an operator named Peters through the phone book, and goes overboard in sending her flowers. Her fiancé is miffed and confronts Frank, leading to Sylvia's double life finally being exposed. But things turn out well, for everyone. A healed Hans can play in Frank's band and Frank gets the undisguised Sylvia around the clock.
